Bush Mountain, at an elevation of  is the second highest peak in the U.S. state of Texas. Bush Mountain is within the Guadalupe Mountains Wilderness of Guadalupe Mountains National Park and can only be accessed via hiking or horseback.

Bush Mountain can be accessed via trailheads at both Pine Springs ( one way) and Dog Canyon in Guadalupe Mountains National Park, and the Bush Mountain Trail passes over the summit of the mountain. The Bush Mountain Campground is located along the trail just below the southeast side of the summit, and the National Park Service has a radio repeater on the summit.

References

Mountains of Texas
Landforms of Culberson County, Texas